Bagrova is a rural locality (a village) in Leninskoye Rural Settlement, Kudymkarsky District, Perm Krai, Russia. The population was 18 as of 2010.

Geography 
Bagrova is located 37 km south of Kudymkar (the district's administrative centre) by road. Sylvozh is the nearest rural locality.

References 

Rural localities in Kudymkarsky District